Konyaaltı is a district in the Antalya Province, Turkey. The name "Konyaaltı" (pronounced ), originates from the expression of "koy altı", which in the Turkish language means "the bay under the cliffs" .

The district is situated beneath the cliffs of Antalya, and extends miles toward the west towards the mountains, with various kinds of beaches including sand and shingle. The water is a little cooler compared to other beaches in Antalya because of an underground creek flowing to the sea. There are modern underground facilities for aesthetic reasons. Transport is easy by means of buses. Destinations are reachable by foot as well but might be time-consuming. The area was started to be developed in the 80s and wasn't historically a part of Antalya's city center. The area originally was a rural/pastoral area and neighborhoods that are currently a part of it were originally villages such as Arapsuyu or Uncali. Until the 80s most of the area was mainly empty and villages had agricultural areas where they grew crops and grazed sheep. There are also many streams in the area which dried up when the area was urbanized. The area also has an ancient city named Olbia that was demolished to make way for a gigantic shopping mall named Migros.

See also
Antalya Museum
https://www.youtube.com/watch?v=HqjgMYQ0ysk&ab_channel=GulserenKozak

References

External links
 Konyaaltı Municipality

Turkish Riviera
Antalya
Populated places in Antalya Province
Districts of Antalya Province
Beaches of Turkey